Hongan may refer to:

Hong'an County, in Hubei, China
Hongan-ji, school of Jōdo Shinshū Buddhism in Japan